The following is a list of musical works which received their premieres at Carnegie Hall:

Symphony No. 9, opus 95, "From the New World" by Antonín Dvořák – December 16, 1893, New York Philharmonic, Anton Seidl conducting
Sinfonia Domestica by Richard Strauss – March 21, 1904, Wetzler Symphony Orchestra, Richard Strauss conducting
Israel Symphony by Ernest Bloch – May 13, 1917, Ernest Bloch conducting
Schelomo by Ernest Bloch – May 13, 1917, Hans Kindler cello, Artur Bodanzky conducting
Concerto in F by George Gershwin – December 3, 1925, New York Symphony Orchestra, George Gershwin, piano, Walter Damrosch conducting
An American in Paris by George Gershwin – December 13, 1928, New York Philharmonic, Walter Damrosch conducting
Music for a Scene from Shelley, Op. 7, by Samuel Barber – March 24, 1935, New York Philharmonic, Werner Janssen conducting
Density 21.5 by Edgard Varèse – February 16, 1936, Georges Barrère, flute
Contrasts by Béla Bartók – January 9, 1939, Benny Goodman, clarinet, Joseph Szigeti, violin, and Endre Petri, piano
 Piano Concerto in B-flat by Arthur Bliss – June 10, 1939, Solomon, New York Philharmonic, Sir Adrian Boult conducting
Chamber Symphony No. 2 op. 38 by Arnold Schoenberg – December 15, 1940, New Friends of Music, Fritz Stiedry conducting
Violin Concerto by Benjamin Britten – March 28, 1940, New York Philharmonic, Antonio Brosa, violin, John Barbirolli conducting
Sinfonia da Requiem by Benjamin Britten – March 29, 1941, New York Philharmonic, John Barbirolli conducting
New World A-Comin' by Duke Ellington – December 11, 1943, Duke Ellington and His Orchestra
Symphonic Metamorphosis of Themes by Carl Maria von Weber by Paul Hindemith – January 20, 1944, New York Philharmonic, Artur Rodziński conducting
Orchestral suite from the ballet, Appalachian Spring by Aaron Copland – October 4, 1944, New York Philharmonic, Artur Rodziński conducting
Ode to Napoleon Buonaparte for Voice and Piano Quintet, op. 41 by Arnold Schoenberg – November 23, 1944, New York Philharmonic, Artur Rodziński conducting
A Stopwatch and an Ordnance Map (revised version with brass) by Samuel Barber – December 17, 1945, Collegiate Chorale, Robert Shaw conducting
Symphony in Three Movements by Igor Stravinsky – January 24, 1946, New York Philharmonic, Igor Stravinsky conducting
Ebony Concerto by Igor Stravinsky – March 25, 1946, Woody Herman and His Orchestra, Walter Hendl conducting
Symphony No. 3, "The Camp Meeting" by Charles Ives – April 5, 1946, New York Little Symphony, Lou Harrison conducting, in Carnegie Chamber Music Hall (now known as Weill Recital Hall)
Hymne pour grande orchestra (Hymne au Saint Sacrament) by Olivier Messiaen – March 13, 1947, New York Philharmonic, Leopold Stokowski conducting
Excursions (first performance of the complete set) by Samuel Barber – November 21, 1947, Nadia Reisenberg, piano
Symphony No. 2 by Charles Ives – February 22, 1951, New York Philharmonic, Leonard Bernstein conducting
Medea's Dance of Vengeance by Samuel Barber – February 2, 1956, New York Philharmonic, Dimitri Mitropoulos conducting
Overture to Candide by Leonard Bernstein – January 26, 1957, New York Philharmonic, Leonard Bernstein conducting
Intermezzo from Vanessa by Samuel Barber – March 15, 1958, New York Philharmonic, Andre Kostelanetz conducting
Symphonic Dances from West Side Story by Leonard Bernstein – February 13, 1961, New York Philharmonic, Lukas Foss conducting
Symphony No. 4 by Charles Ives – April 26, 1965, American Symphony Orchestra, Leopold Stokowski conducting
Mutations from Bach by Samuel Barber – October 7, 1968, American Symphony Orchestra, Leopold Stokowski conducting
Evocations for Orchestra by Carl Ruggles – February 2, 1971, National Orchestral Association, John Perras conducting
Concerto for Oboe and Orchestra by John Corigliano – November 9, 1975, American Symphony Orchestra, Bert Lucarelli, oboe, Akiyama Kazuyoshi conducting
Piano Concerto No. 1 by Milton Babbitt – January 19, 1986, American Composers Orchestra, Alan Feinberg, piano, Charles Wuorinen conducting
Opening Prayer by Leonard Bernstein – December 15, 1986, New York Philharmonic, conducted by the composer on the opening night of the restoresd hall
Concerto No. 1 by Gregory Magarshak – 1991, Manhattan Symphony Orchestra, Peter Tiboris conducting
"The Face in the Lake" original composition by Patrick Doyle – February, 1998
Symphony No. 6 "Plutonian Ode" for soprano and orchestra by Philip Glass, text by Allen Ginsberg – February 3, 2002, American Composers Orchestra, Lauren Flanigan, soprano, Dennis Russell Davies conducting
American Berserk by John Coolidge Adams – February 25, 2002, Garrick Ohlsson, piano
Symphony of Psalms by Imant Raminsh – 2002, Candace Wicke conducting
Women at an Exhibition for chamber orchestra, electronics, and video by Randall Woolf – November 17, 2004, American Composers Orchestra, Steven Sloane conducting, video by Mary Harron and John C. Walsh
Between Hills Briefly Green performed by Vermont Youth Orchestra. Conducted by Troy Peters. September 2004
Algunas metáforas que aluden al tormento, a la angustia y a la Guerra for percussion quartet and chamber orchestra by Carlos Carrillo  – January 21, 2005, American Composers Orchestra and So Percussion, Steven Sloane conducting
Traps Relaxed by Dan Trueman – January 21, 2005, American Composers Orchestra, Dan Trueman, electronic violin and laptop, Steven Sloane conducting
Glimmer by Jason Freeman – January 21, 2005, American Composers Orchestra, Steven Sloane conducting
Concerto for Winds "Some Other Blues" by Daniel Schnyder – February 8, 2005, Orpheus Chamber Orchestra
Introit and Epilogue by Mack Wilberg – March 14, 2006, Box Elder High School Concert Choir, Haslett High School Chorale, Martin High School Chorale (Carnegie Hall National High School Choral Festival Choirs), Craig Jessop conducting
Requiem by Steven Edwards – November 20, 2006
Catenaires by Elliott Carter – December 11, 2006, Pierre-Laurent Aimard, piano (composer present at premiere)
Antworte by TaQ – March 11, 2007, New York Symphonic Ensemble, Mamoru Takahara conducting
Wolf Rounds by Christopher Rouse – March 29, 2007, University of Miami-Frost Wind Ensemble
Concerto for Cello and Orchestra by Thomas Sleeper – March 23, 2008, Florida Youth Orchestra, Thomas Sleeper conducting, Jillian Bloom, cello
The Undeterred by Scott R. Munson – November 18, 2007, piano (Dong Gyun Ham), musical saw (Natalia Paruz) and baritone (Byung Woo Kim)
Violin Concertino by Clint Needham – December 9, 2007, New York Youth Symphony, Ryan McAdams conducting, William R. Harvey, violin
Rain, River, Sea by Dr. Patrick Long – March 7, 2008, Susquehanna University Masterworks Chorus and Orchestra, Dr. Jennifer Sacher-Wiley conducting, Nina Tober, soprano, David Steinau, baritone
Eureka! by Patrick J. Burns – March 24, 2008, Westlake High School Wind Ensemble, Mr. Brian Peter conductor.
Incline by Matt McBane – March 24, 2008, Westlake High School Chamber Orchestra, Mrs. Elizabeth Blake conductor.
Hit the Ground Running by Gordon Goodwin – March 24, 2008, Westlake High School Studio Jazz, Mr. Brian Peter conducting, Gordon Goodwin, tenor saxophone
The Five Changes by Gregory Youtz – June 1, 2008, Oregon State University Wind Ensemble, Dr. Christopher Chapman conducting, Robert Brudvig, percussion
The Phoenix Rising by Stella Sung – June 15, 2008, performed by the Florida Festival Youth Orchestra, conducted by Jonathan May.
Alligator Songs by Daniel May – June 15, 2008, performed by the Florida Festival Youth Orchestra, conducted by Jonathan May.
The Ponce De Leon Suite by Robert Kerr – June 15, 2008, performed by the Florida Festival Youth Orchestra, conducted by Jonathan May.
Symphony No. 5 (Concerto for Orchestra) by Ellen Taaffe Zwilich – October 27, 2008, performed by The Juilliard Orchestra conducted by James Conlon
"Skyward" by Adam Wolf – June 16, 2009, performed by Eastlake High School led by Charles Wolf
"An American Christmas Carol" – December 2, 2010 – Tim Janis
Pilgrim Soul by Augusta Read Thomas – February 10, 2011, performed by Alyssa Kuhn, violin, Julieta Mihai, violin, Matthew Kuhn, cor anglais, Michael Barta, conducting
Sufi Music Ensemble May 21, 2011, Performed by Steve Gorn, Hidayat Khan and  Samir Chatterjee organized by the South Asian Music and Arts Association (SAMAA) in honor of Vilayat Khan.
"Dies Irae" by Gabriel Smallwood – February 5, 2012 – Choirs from Forest Hills High School, Fort Hamilton High School, and Scarsdale High School; and The Orchestra of St. Luke's
"A Man's Life" by Thomas Reeves – February 5, 2012 – Choirs from Forest Hills High School, Fort Hamilton High School, and Scarsdale High School; and The Orchestra of St. Luke's
"Thus it was" by Anthony Constantino – February 5, 2012 – Choirs from Forest Hills High School, Fort Hamilton High School, and Scarsdale High School; and The Orchestra of St. Luke's
After the Dazzle of Day by Corey Rubin – February 7, 2014, performed by the Duxbury High School Wind Ensemble, String Ensemble, and Chamber Singers, Jeffrey Grogan conducting
The Drop that Contained the Sea by Christopher Tin – April 13, 2014, performed by the DCINY Singers and Orchestra, Dr. Jonathan Griffith, conductor
Spirits Rising: The Texan Rider by Charles Fernandez – April 23, 2014, performed by the Tarleton State University Wind Ensemble, Dr. Anthony Pursell, conductor
Psalm 92 by Anthony LaBounty – November 25, 2014, performed by the Foothill High School Wind Symphony, Mr. Travis Pardee, director, Foothill High School (Henderson, Nevada)
"Trionfante in D Minor for String Orchestra" original composition by Ben Eidt – March 16, 2015, performed by the Athens High School Philharmonic Orchestra, Mrs. Claire Murphy conducting
Firing On All Cylinders by Matt Conaway, performed by the Purdue University Wind Ensemble on March 29, 2016
March of Defiance by Michael D Blostein, performed by the Averill Park High School Symphonic Orchestra on June 13, 2016
"Kaku, kupala| Fear in Neutral Buoyancy" original orchestral composition by Sean J. Kennedy – September 27, 2015, performed by Youth Philharmonic International Orchestra, conducted by Jose Luis Gomez
"Unsung Hero" original composition by Kavon Emtiaz – June 14, 2016, performed by the Denver Young Artists Orchestra, conducted by Wes Kenney
"Ain't-a That Good News" medley of traditional spirituals by Sally K. Albrecht- June 25, 2016, performed by WorldStrides Middle School Honors Junior Choir, conducted by Sally Albrecht
"I'm Bound for Glory!" by Sally K. Albrecht - June 23, 2018, performed by WorldStrides Middle School Honors Junior Choir, conducted by Sally Albrecht

References

Carnegie Hall